Choice Boswell Randell (January 1, 1857 – October 19, 1945) was a U.S. Representative from Texas. He was the nephew of Lucius Jeremiah Gartrell.

Biography

Charles Boswell Randell was born to James L. and Louisa Amantha (Gartrell) Randell in Murray County, Georgia.

He attended public and private schools and the North Georgia Agricultural College at Dahlonega, Georgia, but did not graduate. Instead, he changed his course of study to law and was admitted to the Georgia State Bar in 1878. Randell commenced his law practice in Denison, Texas, in January 1879. He moved to Sherman, Texas, in 1882 and continued the practice of law.

Public service

Randell was elected as a Democrat to the fifty-seventh and to the five succeeding Congresses (March 4, 1901 – March 3, 1913). He did not support women's suffrage and expressed in a letter to women's suffragette leader Ermina Thompson Folsom that his concern was race-based. Randell was the author of the Anti-Graft Resolutions to prevent members of the United States Congress from receiving gifts or fees from anyone with business before Congress.

With pending reapportionment of his congressional district, Randell chose to make a bid for the United States Senate in 1912, rather than run for re-election as a member of the United States House of Representatives.  Randell was unsuccessful in his Senate bid, and Sam Rayburn succeeded him in the U.S. House.

After his career in public service ended, Randell resumed the practice of law.

Death
He died in Sherman, Texas, October 19, 1945, and is interred in West Hill Cemetery.

Fraternal memberships
Randell had membership in the following organizations:

Freemasons
Knights of Pythias
Odd Fellows
Woodmen of the World
Improved Order of Red Men

References

Sources

1857 births
1945 deaths
Democratic Party members of the United States House of Representatives from Texas